Arthur Trevor Haddon (22 August 1864 – 13 December 1941), also known as Trevor Haddon, was a British painter and illustrator.

Life and career 
Arthur Trevor Haddon was born on 22 August 1864 in London. He won a scholarship to the prestigious Slade School of Fine Art and enrolled in 1883. There, he studied under Alphonse Legros. He also studied with Hubert von Herkomer from 1888 to 1890.

Although he lived primarily in London and Cambridge, Haddon traveled to Rome, Madrid, Venice, California, South America, Hawaii, and Asia.  He died in Cambridge on December 13, 1941, at age 77.

Work
Haddon was both a painter and illustrator.

Selected paintings

Illustrations in publications 

Haddon illustrated the following works:

 Browne, Edith A., Peeps at Many Lands: Spain, with twelve full-page illustrations in colour by Trevor Haddon and Edgar T. A. Wigram, London: Adam & Charles Black, 1910
 Calvert, Albert Frederick, Granada Present and Bygone, (illustrations by Trevor Haddon), J. M. Dent, London, 1908
 Calvert, Albert Frederick, Southern Spain: Painted By Trevor Haddon, A. & C. Black, Ltd., London, 1908
 Gould, Baring,  A Book of the Rhine from Cleve to Mainz. With eight Illustrations in Colour by Trevor Haddon, London, Methuen 1906
 Nye, G.H.F, Our Island Home (8 illustrations by Trevor Haddon), Bemrose & Sons, Limited, London, c. 1898
 Okey, Thomas,  The Old Venetian Palaces and Old Venetian Folk. With Fifty Coloured and Other Illustrations by Trevor Haddon, London. J. M. Dent & Co. 1907
 Thirlmere, Rowland, Letters from Catalonia and other parts of Spain (illustrations by Trevor Haddon), Hutchinson & Co., London, 1905

See also
List of Orientalist artists
Orientalism

References

1864 births
1941 deaths
19th-century British painters
20th-century British painters
British male painters
Hawaii artists
Orientalist painters
19th-century British male artists
20th-century British male artists